Visa requirements for Eritrean citizens are administrative entry restrictions by the authorities of other states placed on citizens of Eritrea. As of 2 July 2019, Eritrean citizens had visa-free or visa on arrival access to 38 countries and territories, ranking the Eritrean passport 101st in terms of travel freedom (tied with the passports of Bangladesh, Iran, Lebanon and North Korea) according to the Henley Passport Index.

Visa requirements map

Visa requirements

Dependent, Disputed, or Restricted territories
Unrecognized or partially recognized countries

Dependent and autonomous territories

See also

Visa policy of Eritrea
Eritrean passport

Notes

References

Eritrea
Foreign relations of Eritrea